Trichilia silvatica is a species of plant in the family Meliaceae. It is endemic to Brazil.  It is threatened by habitat loss.

References

silvatica
Endemic flora of Brazil
Vulnerable flora of South America
Taxonomy articles created by Polbot